Philip J. Quigley is the retired chief executive officer of Pacific Telesis Corporation.  He has been on the board of directors of Wells Fargo & Company, SRI International, and several other Fortune 500 companies.

References

1942 births
Living people
Wells Fargo
Businesspeople from San Francisco
Directors of SRI International